Thamar Zweistra (born 3 December 1982 in Dordrecht, Netherlands) is a Dutch dressage rider. She competed at the 2022 FEI World Championships in Herning, where she placed 20th in the individual dressage competition, and 5th with the Dutch team. In 2022 Zweistra also competed in the World Cup Finals in Leipzig, finishing 11th in the individual ranking. She was also on the longlist for the 2020 Olympic Games in Tokyo.

Zweistra was very successful as a young rider and represented The Netherlands at both the Junior and Young Riders European championships, where she won several team medals.

References

External links
 

Living people
1982 births
Dutch female equestrians
Dutch dressage riders
21st-century Dutch women